The French Society of Cinematographers (French: Association française des  directrices et directeurs de la photographie cinématographique), or the AFC for short, is France's foremost professional organization of French cinematographers. Founded in 1990 by Henri Alekan, Raoul Coutard, Alain Derobe, Pierre-William Glenn, and Georges Strouvé, who were soon joined by Eduardo Serra, Pierre Lhomme, and Robert Alazraki, the AFC today has over one hundred members.

The AFC receives financial support from the Centre national de la cinématographie, and is a co-founder of Imago, The European Federation of Cinematographers.

Its headquarters are located at 8, rue Francœur in the 18e arrondissement of Paris, next to the Fémis cinema academy.

Members of the Board of Directors for 2019
 President: Gilles Porte 
 Vice-Presidents: Richard Andry, Caroline Champetier, Éric Guichard
 General Secretary: Nathalie Durand
 Secretary: Vincent Jeannot
 Treasurer: Michel Abramowicz
 Vice-Treasurer: Jean-Marie Dreujou

Activities
 The AFC publishes a journal entitled Lumières.
 The AFC drew up the Charte de l'image
 The AFC partners with French manufactures of cinematographic equipment.
 Every year, the AFC hosts its annual trade fair, the Micro Salon, in Paris, where equipment manufacturers, service providers, and users gather to discuss cinematographic innovations.
 Every year, the AFC hosts the Journées AFC de la Postproduction
 The AFC participates in the Cannes Film Festival, and organizes professional events on an international scale at its stand, the Pavillon de l'Image.
 The AFC publishes original interviews granted by cinematographers whose films have been selected by the Festival. 
 The AFC publishes its monthly la AFC Newsletter.
The AFC has created and maintains Le CinéDico, a thematic multilingual dictionary for cinematographic and audiovisual terminology, with translations in French, English, German, Chinese, Spanish, Italian, Polish, Portuguese, and Russian.

Notes

External links 
 The AFC's official website
 Le CineDico

Cinema of Paris
Cinematography organizations
Film organizations in France
Organizations based in Paris
Film-related professional associations